Chelon parsia, the goldspot mullet, is a ray-finned fish of the family Mugilidae. It is one of seven species in the genus Chelon. This species is found in the Indian Ocean, specifically in shallow coastal waters of Pakistan, India, Sri Lanka and the Andaman Islands. It is also lives in lagoons, estuaries and even tidal rivers.

Description
This species reaches a maximum length of 16 cm.

It is oviparous like other members of its genus.

References

Further reading
Thomson, J.M., 1990. Mugilidae. p. 855-859. In J.C. Quero, J.C. Hureau, C. Karrer, A. Post and L. Saldanha (eds.) Check-list of the fishes of the eastern tropical Atlantic (CLOFETA). JNICT, Lisbon; SEI, Paris; and UNESCO, Paris. Vol. 2. (Ref. 7399).

parsia
Fish described in 1822